HMS Exmouth was an E-class destroyer flotilla leader built for the Royal Navy in the early 1930s. Although assigned to the Home Fleet upon completion, the ship was attached to the Mediterranean Fleet in 1935–36 during the Abyssinia Crisis. During the Spanish Civil War of 1936–1939 she spent considerable time in Spanish waters, enforcing the arms blockade imposed by Britain and France on both sides of the conflict. Exmouth was assigned to convoy escort and anti-submarine patrol duties in the Western Approaches when World War II began in September 1939. She was sunk by a German submarine in January 1940 while escorting a merchant ship north of Scotland.

Description
She was powered by two Parsons geared steam turbines, each driving one propeller shaft, using steam provided by three Admiralty three-drum boilers. The ship's complement was 175 officers and ratings.

The ship mounted five 45-calibre 4.7-inch (120 mm) Mark IX guns in single mounts. For anti-aircraft defence, Exmouth had two quadruple Mark I mounts for the 0.5 inch Vickers Mark III machine gun. She was fitted with two above-water quadruple torpedo tube mounts for  torpedoes. One depth charge rail and two throwers were fitted; 20 depth charges were originally carried, but this increased to 35 shortly after the war began.

Service
Exmouth was ordered on 1 November 1932 under the 1931 Naval Programme, and was laid down at Portsmouth Dockyard on 15 March 1933. She was launched on 30 January 1934, named the following day, and commissioned for service on 9 November 1934. On commissioning, Exmouth was assigned as leader of the 5th Destroyer Flotilla of the Home Fleet. The increased tensions between Italy and Abyssinia – eventually leading to the outbreak of the Second Italo-Abyssinian War – caused the Admiralty to attach the flotilla to the Mediterranean Fleet from August 1935 to March 1936, although Exmouth was refitted in Alexandria from 4 October 1935 to 5 January 1936. The ship patrolled Spanish waters during the Spanish Civil War enforcing the edicts of the Non-Intervention Committee in between annual refits at Portsmouth between 17 November 1936 and 19 January 1937 and 21 November 1938 and 16 January 1939. She returned to Britain in March and Exmouth was assigned to training duties and local flotilla work based at Portsmouth on 28 April. She carried out these duties until 2 August, when she was placed into full commission as the leader of the 12th Destroyer Flotilla.

Exmouth and her flotilla were initially assigned to the Home Fleet upon the outbreak of World War II in September 1939. In December, she was transferred to the Western Approaches Command to carry out patrols and escort convoys, but was transferred to Rosyth in January 1940 to carry out the same duties in the North Sea. She sank with the loss of all hands. After sinking Exmouth, the submarine also fired on Cyprian Prince whose master deemed it too dangerous to pick up survivors. Eighteen bodies were later found washed ashore by a schoolboy playing truant near Wick. They were buried with full military honours in the cemetery at Wick.

Aftermath
The wreck of Exmouth was discovered in the Moray Firth in July 2001 by an independent expedition, with their findings being verified by Historic Scotland. The wreck is one of those listed as a 'protected place' under the Protection of Military Remains Act 1986.

Notes

References

External links
 BBC news links relating to the discovery of the wreck
 MS Miranda at uboat.net
 MS Tekla at uboat.net
 HMS Exmouth (1940) Public Facebook Group

 

E and F-class destroyers of the Royal Navy
Ships built on the River Clyde
1934 ships
World War II destroyers of the United Kingdom
Maritime incidents in January 1940
World War II shipwrecks in the North Sea
Protected Wrecks of Scotland
Ships sunk by German submarines in World War II
Ships lost with all hands
History of the Scottish Highlands
Caithness
1934 in Scotland
1940 in Scotland